Hamina (Sweden ) is a town and a municipality of Finland.
is water. The population density is
. The population of the central town is approximately 10,000. The municipal language of Hamina is  Finnish.

Highway 7 (E18) is the town's road connection to Helsinki, after it was upgraded to a continuous motorway in September 2014. Hamina is also the base of one of the most important harbors of Finland, the Port of Hamina-Kotka. The port specializes in forest products and the transit of cargo to Russia. One of Google's five European data centers is situated in Hamina.

History
Vehkalahti was as a municipality first mentioned in 1336. At the proposal of Count Peter Brahe, the area surrounding the Vehkalahti church (today St. Mary's Church) received its charter in 1653 through the establishment of Vehkalahden Uusikaupunki (Veckelax Nystad in Swedish, "The New Town of Vehkalahti"). The town was later destroyed during the Great Northern War in 1712.

As the commercially vibrant city of Vyborg was lost to Russia in 1721, Fredrikshamn (named in 1723 in the honor of King Frederick I of Sweden) was dedicated to replace it. The town, hitherto a small domestic port with restricted trading privilege's, was granted extensive rights to conduct foreign trade. The Finnish speaking population soon abbreviated the name of the town to Hamina. The reconstruction of the town was completed between 1722 and 1724. The star-shaped fortress and the circular town plan, designed by Axel Löwen, were based on Central European and Italian Renaissance concepts from the 16th century. Fortress towns with a circular street plan like this are quite rare; one example is Palmanova in Italy.

In 1743, Hamina was surrendered to Russia, after the Russo–Swedish War, 1741–1743, and the town of Loviisa was the next Swedish candidate for an Eastern-Finnish trade center. Hamina became a Russian frontier town, for which a fortress was desirable.

The Treaty of Fredrikshamn (1809), by which Sweden ceded Finland, including parts of the province of Lappland and Åland, was signed in Hamina. Thus Sweden was split, and the eastern half was formed into the Grand Duchy of Finland, an autonomous part of the Russian Empire. In 1812, the previously conquered territories known as Old Finland (including Hamina) were joined to the Grand Duchy.

Hamina Cadet School was founded in 1819 and was in operation until 1903. In 1920 the Reserve Officer School began in the same facilities.

Because the town was founded next to the Vehkalahti Church, the municipal center had always been inside the town borders. Vehkalahti and Hamina were consolidated in 2003, and the old coat of arms was replaced with Vehkalahti's coat of arms. The old coat of arms was readopted in January 2013.

Results of the 2021 Finnish municipal elections, resulted in The Finns Party being the largest group on Hamina council, in Hamina.

Main sights 
 Town Hall: Originally built in 1798, it was renovated by Carl Ludvig Engel in 1840.
 Reserve Officer School: The site which trains reserve officers in the Army Academy of the Finnish Army
 Town Museum: It is located in a building where King Gustav III of Sweden and Empress Catherine II of Russia met in 1783.
 Shopkeeper's Museum
 Google Data Center: (former Stora Enso pulp factory)
 Hamina Fortress: Built in the 18th century, it is one of the star forts in Finland. The corners of the fortress form six bastions, named after towns in Finland. The Central Bastion was added at the end of the 18th century, and is currently used for cultural events.

Churches 
St. Mary's Church, previously known as Vehkalahti Church, is the oldest building in Kymenlaakso. It was originally built in the Middle Ages, but it was burnt in 1821 and the current neoclassical exterior is designed by Carl Ludvig Engel and completed in 1828. The church has a museum dedicated to the church life from the 18th century onwards.
St. John's Church, formerly known as Hamina Church, was built between 1841-1843. It was designed by Carl Ludvig Engel in the neoclassical style.
Church of St. Peter and St. Paul, the Orthodox church in Hamina, was built in 1837. It was designed by Italian-French architect Louis Visconti. The architecture of the church is combination of neoclassical and Byzantine elements.

Twin towns
  Vordingborg, Denmark
  Falun, Sweden
  Paide, Estonia
  Røros, Norway

Notable people
Magnus Enckell (1870–1925), symbolist painter
Simo Häyhä (1905–2002), a farmer and military sniper
Pelle Miljoona (born 1955), a musician
Hugo Simberg (1873-1917), a painter
Emilie Mechelin (1838-1917), opera singer and pedagogue
Leo Mechelin (1839-1914), a professor, statesman, senator and liberal reformer
Meri Toppelius (1863–1896), educational theorist

See also
 Maarianhamina

References

External links 

 Official website of Hamina in English 
 Guide map of Hamina
 Map of Hamina
 Hamina-Fredrikshamn at Northern Fortress

 
Cities and towns in Finland
Populated coastal places in Finland
Grand Duchy of Finland
Port cities and towns in Finland
Populated places established in 1653
1653 establishments in Sweden